White Lodge is a grade II listed building on Hadley Green Road in Monken Hadley. The original house was built before 1711, and extended in the late 18th century.

The ornate door case is a particular feature of the house and the 2009 conservatory extension in steel at the rear of the property received a certificate of merit in the use of steelwork.

The property was placed on the market by Statons in 2011 and sold in November 2013 for £3.3 million. As of July 2015, the property is in the process of renovation.

References

External links

Grade II listed buildings in the London Borough of Barnet
Houses in the London Borough of Barnet
Monken Hadley